A diagram is a symbolic representation of information using visualization techniques. Diagrams have been used since prehistoric times on walls of caves, but became more prevalent during the Enlightenment. Sometimes, the technique uses a three-dimensional visualization which is then projected onto a two-dimensional surface. The word graph is sometimes used as a synonym for diagram.

Overview 
The term "diagram" in its commonly used sense can have a general or specific meaning:  
 visual information device : Like the term "illustration", "diagram" is used as a collective term standing for the whole class of technical genres, including graphs, technical drawings and tables.
 specific kind of visual display : This is the genre that shows qualitative data with shapes that are connected by lines, arrows, or other visual links.

In science the term is used in both ways. For example, Anderson (1997) stated more generally: "diagrams are pictorial, yet abstract, representations of information, and maps, line graphs, bar charts, engineering blueprints, and architects' sketches are all examples of diagrams, whereas photographs and video are not". On the other hand, Lowe (1993) defined diagrams as specifically "abstract graphic portrayals of the subject matter they represent".

In the specific sense diagrams and charts contrast with computer graphics, technical illustrations, infographics, maps, and technical drawings, by showing "abstract rather than literal representations of information". The essence of a diagram can be seen as:
 a form of visual formatting devices
 a display that does not show quantitative data (numerical data), but rather relationships and abstract information
 with building blocks such as geometrical shapes connected by lines, arrows, or other visual links.
Or in Hall's (1996) words "diagrams are simplified figures, caricatures in a way, intended to convey essential meaning". These simplified figures are often based on a set of rules. The basic shape according to White (1984) can be characterized in terms of "elegance, clarity, ease, pattern, simplicity, and validity". Elegance is basically determined by whether or not the diagram is "the simplest and most fitting solution to a problem".

Diagrammatology 
Diagrammatology is the academic study of diagrams. Scholars note that while a diagram may look similar to the thing that it represents, this is not necessary. Rather a diagram may only have structural similarity to what it represents, an idea often attributed to Charles Sanders Peirce. Structural similarity can be defined in terms of a mapping between parts of the diagram and parts of what the diagram represents and the properties of this mapping, such as maintaining relations between these parts and facts about these relations. This is related to the concept of isomorphism, or homomorphism in mathematics. 

Sometimes certain geometric properties (such as which points are closer) of the diagram can be mapped to properties of the thing that a diagram represents. On the other hand the representation of an object in a diagram may be overly specific and properties that are true in the diagram may not be true for the object the diagram represents. A diagram may act as a means of cognitive extension allowing reasoning to take place on the diagram based on which constraints are similar.

Gallery of diagram types 

There are at least the following types of diagrams:

 Logical or conceptual diagrams, which take a collection of items and relationships between them, and express them by giving each item a 2D position, while the relationships are expressed as connections between the items or overlaps between the items, for example:

 Quantitative diagrams, which display a relationship between two variables that take either discrete or a continuous range of values; for example:

 Schematics and other types of diagrams, for example:

Many of these types of diagrams are commonly generated using diagramming software such as Visio and Gliffy.

Diagrams may also be classified according to use or purpose, for example, explanatory and/or how to diagrams.

Thousands of diagram techniques exist. Some more examples follow:

Specific diagram types 

A
Activity diagram used in UML 6/9 and SysML

B
Bachman diagram
Booch – used in software engineering
Bow-tie diagram
Block diagram
Block definition diagram (BDD) used in SysML

C
Carroll diagram
Cartogram
Catalytic cycle
Computer network diagram
Chemical equation
Curly arrow diagram
Category theory diagrams
Cause-and-effect diagram
Chord diagram (disambiguation)
Circuit diagram
Class diagram – from UML 1/9
Cobweb diagram
Collaboration diagram – from UML 2.0
Communication diagram – from UML 2.0
Commutative diagram
Comparison diagram
Component diagram – from UML 3/9
Composite structure diagram – from UML 2.0
Concept map
Constellation diagram
Context diagram
Control flow diagram
Contour diagram
Cordier diagram
Cross functional flowchart

D
Data model diagram
Data flow diagram
Data structure diagram
Dendrogram
Dependency diagram
Deployment diagram – from UML 9/9
Dynkin diagram
Dot and cross diagram
Double bubble map – used in education
Drakon-chart

E
Entity-relationship diagram (ERD)
Event-driven process chain
Euler diagram
Eye diagram – a diagram of a received telecommunications signal
Exploded-view drawing
Express-G
Extended functional flow block diagram (EFFBD)

F
Family tree
Feynman diagram
Flow chart
Flow process chart
Flow diagram
Fusion diagram
Free body diagram

G
Gantt chart – shows the timing of tasks or activities (used in project management)
Grotrian diagram
Goodman diagram – shows the fatigue data (example: for a wind turbine blades)

H
Hasse diagram
HIPO diagram

I
Internal block diagram (IBD) used in SysML
IDEF0
IDEF1 (entity relations)
Interaction overview diagram – from UML
Ishikawa diagram

J
Jackson diagram
Jones diagram

K
Karnaugh map
Kinematic diagram
Knot diagram

L
Ladder diagram
Levi graph
Line of balance
Link grammar diagram

M
Martin ERD
Message sequence chart
Mind map – used for learning, brainstorming, memory, visual thinking and problem solving
Minkowski spacetime diagram
Molecular orbital diagram
Motion diagram

N
N2
Nassi–Shneiderman diagram or structogram – a representation for structured programming
Nomogram
Network diagram

O
O–C diagram – a diagnostic plot of observed minus predicted values over time
Object diagram – from UML 2/9
Organigram
Onion diagram – also known as "stacked Venn diagram"

P
Package diagram from UML 4/9 and SysML
Parametric diagram from SysML
PERT
Petri net – shows the structure of a distributed system as a directed bipartite graph with annotations
Phylogenetic tree - represents a phylogeny (evolutionary relationships among groups of organisms)
Piping and instrumentation diagram (P&ID)
Phase diagram used to present solid/liquid/gas information
Plant diagram
Pressure volume diagram used to analyse engines
Pourbaix diagram
Process flow diagram or PFD – used in chemical engineering
Program structure diagram

R
Radar chart
Radial diagram
Requirement diagram Used in SysML
Rich picture
R-diagram
Routing diagram

S
Sankey diagram – represents material, energy or cost flows with quantity proportional arrows in a process network
Sentence diagram – represents the grammatical structure of a natural language sentence
Sequence diagram from UML 8/9 and SysML
SDL/GR diagram – specification and description Language. SDL is a formal language used in computer science.
Smith chart
Spider chart
Spray diagram
SSADM – structured systems analysis and design methodology (used in software engineering)
Star chart/Celestial sphere
State diagram are used for state machines in software engineering  from UML 7/9 
Swim lane
Syntax diagram used in software engineering to represent a context-free grammar
Systems Biology Graphical Notation – a graphical notation used in diagrams of biochemical and cellular processes studied in systems biology
System context diagram
System structure
Systematic layout planning

T
Timing diagram: digital timing diagram
Timing diagram: UML 2.0
TQM Diagram
Tree structure
Treemap

U
UML diagram – Unified Modeling Language (used in software engineering)
Use case diagram – from UML 5/9 and SysML

V
Value stream mapping
Venn diagram
Violin plot
Voronoi diagram

W
Warnier-Orr
Wedge-dash diagram
Williot diagram

Y
Yourdon-Coad – see Edward Yourdon, used in software engineering

See also 

 Chart
 Table (information)
 Diagrammatic reasoning
 Diagrammatology
 Experience model
 List of graphical methods
 Mathematical diagram
 Plot (graphics)
 commons:Specific diagram types – gallery of many diagram types.
 commons:Commons:Diagram resources

References

Further reading 

 
 Michael Anderson, Peter Cheng, Volker Haarslev (Eds.) (2000). Theory and Application of Diagrams: First International Conference, Diagrams 2000. Edinburgh, Scotland, UK, September 1–3, 2000. Proceedings.
 Garcia, M. (ed.), (2012) The Diagrams of Architecture. Wiley. Chichester.

Infographics
 
Modeling languages